Gorgasia galzini, the speckled garden eel or Galzin's garden eel, is a species of garden eel. It reaches  in length. Like other garden eels, this species lives in groups in sandy areas. The eels peep outside and look like very thin stems emerging from the sand. When possible predators get close to them, they retreat and disappear in the sand.

Etymology
The fish is named in honor of fish ecologist René Galzin (b. 1950), who provided many eel specimens for study and valuable information on the eel's biology.

References

galzini
Taxa named by Peter Henry John Castle
Taxa named by John Ernest Randall
Fish described in 1999